Denby Bottles is a settlement in Derbyshire, England. It is located on the B6179 road in Denby. Denby Bottles Methodist Church is in Danesby Crescent. Each of the cottages have a segment of garden which is across the road and the brook.

Denby Bottles is situated to the right- hand side of the B6179 - coming from Kilburn Toll Bar - and is the Danesby Rise area.  The Ordnance Survey  Map of 1914 (surveyed 1879, revised 1913 and re-levelled 1913–14) clearly prints 'Denby Bottles' to the left-hand side of the houses depicted. The Bottle Brook houses are situated at the end of Ryknield Road which leaves the B6179 at Denby Smithy Houses.

Hamlets in Derbyshire
Geography of Amber Valley